The Buffalo and Northwestern Railroad was a railway extending from Waynoka, Oklahoma to Buffalo, Oklahoma, passing through Freedom, Oklahoma.  About 52 miles in length, the line was completed in May, 1920 and sold to another railroad in June, 1920.

History
When citizens of Harper County decided to link their county seat of Buffalo with the railroads, Waynoka was an appealing destination: that locale had been founded in 1888 on the rail line of a subsidiary of the Atchison, Topeka and Santa Fe Railway (AT&SF), and by 1908 it had the largest railyards in Oklahoma.  Accordingly, the Buffalo and Northwestern Railway Company was incorporated in Oklahoma on April 10, 1916.   However, that company  was subsequently reorganized, and in its place the Buffalo and Northwestern Railroad Company was incorporated in Oklahoma on July 18, 1919.  Work was pursued on a line from Waynoka, passing through Woods and Woodward countries and into Harper, with the task completed in May, 1920 when the trackage reached Buffalo.  The line was about 52 miles in length.

The town of Freedom was bypassed by the tracks.  However, so important was the railroad that the town relocated to be on the line.

The railroad’s independent existence was short-lived.  The line was purchased by the AT&SF on July 1, 1920. Much later, the AT&SF filed for abandonment of 51 miles of the line, doing so on November 15, 1982.  This has left Buffalo with no rail service.

References

Oklahoma railroads
Defunct Oklahoma railroads